Gary Ingham (9 October 1964 – 20 November 2012) was an English professional footballer and coach who played as a goalkeeper. He spent most of his career in non-league football but had two spells in the Football League with Doncaster Rovers.

Playing career
Born in Rotherham, began his career with hometown club Rotherham United. After a spell with Kiveton Park in August 1983, he signed for Gainsborough Trinity, where he spent loan spells at Shepshed Charterhouse, Goole Town, Bridlington Town and Maltby Miners Welfare.

He returned to Rotherham United in March 1993, moving to Doncaster Rovers in March 1994, for whom he made his Football League debut. After a spell back with Gainsborough Trinity he returned to Doncaster Rovers in August 1997, making a further 10 Football League appearances. He later played for Conference side Stalybridge Celtic; after suffering an injury he was loaned to Stocksbridge Park Steels (where he made 19 appearances) and then sold to Leek Town. He returned to Stalybridge Celtic in 1999, and then moved back to Gainsborough Trinity in 2001, his third spell with the club.

He joined Belper Town as a player-coach in June 2002, moving to Frickley Athletic in October 2004. He moved to Grantham Town in 2006, before returning to Stocksbridge Park Steels as player-assistant manager. He also played for Ossett Albion.

Coaching career
Ingham was a player-coach at Belper Town, and worked as an assistant manager at Stocksbridge Park Steels. He left the club in November 2011.

Death
Ingham died on 20 November 2012.

References

1964 births
2012 deaths
English footballers
Rotherham United F.C. players
Kiveton Park F.C. players
Gainsborough Trinity F.C. players
Shepshed Dynamo F.C. players
Goole Town F.C. players
Bridlington Town A.F.C. players
Maltby Main F.C. players
Doncaster Rovers F.C. players
Stalybridge Celtic F.C. players
Stocksbridge Park Steels F.C. players
Leek Town F.C. players
Belper Town F.C. players
Frickley Athletic F.C. players
Grantham Town F.C. players
Ossett Albion A.F.C. players
English Football League players
Association football goalkeepers